Genevieve Fortin  (born 20 April 1972) is a Canadian freestyle skier. She was born in Montreal. She competed at the 1994 Winter Olympics, in women's moguls.

References

External links 
 

1972 births
Skiers from Montreal
Living people
Canadian female freestyle skiers
Olympic freestyle skiers of Canada
Freestyle skiers at the 1994 Winter Olympics